Episcopal Collegiate School is an independent college preparatory school located in Little Rock, Arkansas established in 1998 under the name "The Cathedral School."

In July 2003, it changed its name to Episcopal Collegiate School. It has a total student body of approximately 780 students and an average class size of 15, and the teacher to student ratio is approximately 7:1. It has a financial endowment of over $50 million, which was contributed by Jackson T. Stephens, his son, Warren Stephens and daughter-in-law, Harriet C. Stephens. Episcopal Collegiate School's colors are hunter green, white, and navy blue and its mascot is the Wildcat.

Affiliations
Episcopal is accredited by Southwestern Association of Episcopal Schools and Arkansas Non-Public Schools Accrediting Association. Episcopal also has affiliations or is a member of: National Association of Episcopal Schools, School and Student Service for Financial Aid, Association for Supervision and Curriculum Development, International Reading Association, National Council of Teachers of Mathematics, Arkansas Activities Association, National Science Teachers' Association, and National Council of Teachers of English.

Athletics
Episcopal offers football, tennis, golf, volleyball, cross country, cheerleading, boys and girls basketball, wrestling, baseball, lacrosse, soccer, softball, and track.
They have won the following state championships:
Basketball 2014, 2015, 2017
Girls cross country 2021
Golf 2003, 2009, 2011, 2012
Boys tennis 2003, 2004, 2005, 2007, 2008, 2009, 2010, 2011, 2013, 2014, 2015, 2016, 2017, 2018, 2019, 2020, 2021
Girls tennis 2008, 2009, 2010, 2011, 2012, 2013, 2014, 2015, 2016, 2017, 2018, 2019
Track and field 2013
Girls volleyball 2019
Football 2020, 2021
Boys cross country 2020

References

Episcopal schools in the United States
Educational institutions established in 1998
Buildings and structures in Little Rock, Arkansas
High schools in Little Rock, Arkansas
Schools in Pulaski County, Arkansas
Education in Little Rock, Arkansas
Private K-12 schools in Arkansas
1998 establishments in Arkansas